Quartering may refer to:

 Dividing into four parts:
Dismemberment - a form of execution
Hanged, drawn and quartered - another form of execution
Quartering (heraldry)
 Coning and quartering a process for splitting of an analytic sample
 Quartering, a method in the assaying of gold; see 
The Quartering Acts, requiring American civilians to provide living spaces for British soldiers prior to the American Revolution

See also
 Quarter (disambiguation)